General elections were held in Belgium on 9 June 1868. In the elections for the Chamber of Representatives the result was a victory for the Liberal Party, which won 72 of the 122 seats. Voter turnout was 55.6%, although only 55,297 people were eligible to vote.

Under the alternating system, elections were only held in five out of the nine provinces: Antwerp, Brabant, Luxembourg, Namur and West Flanders. A special election was held in the arrondissement of Tongeren.

Results

Chamber of Representatives

References

1860s elections in Belgium
General
Belgium
Belgium